The Chilean Law N° 13.196 known as Ley Reservada del Cobre (Spanish for "Restricted Law on Copper") was a highly controversial secret law ("restricted" in this context refers to the law not being freely available) issued on 29 October 1958 under the administration of Carlos Ibáñez del Campo in order to allocate revenues from the copper mining corporations for the purchase and maintenance of Materiel of the Chilean armed forces. The law was replaced in 2019, with the armed forces' finances scheduled to come under the national budget by 2029.

History 
Automatic military funding from natural resources revenues can be traced in Chile to the 1880s.

On 7 January 1938, law N° 6.152, known as Ley de Cruceros (Spanish for "Cruciers Law"), was issued to transfer 90% of the leasing receipts of South Patagonian territories to arms purchases. Later, in 1942, the Chilean Government, worried about the ongoing Pacific War and the defense, created the CONSUDENA, Consejo Superior de la Defensa Nacional, and allowed them to allocate revenues from currency dealings, alcohol tax, cigarettes tax and income from big copper companies for the purchase of weapons without parliamentary oversight.

The Ley de Cruceros or Ley Reservada del Cobre was issued in 1958 after a serious military incident on the Snipe islet by the administration of President Ibáñez in order to deviate funds from tax revenues from big copper mining corporations directly to the armed forces. The Chilean nationalization of copper transferred in 1971 the properties of the big copper mining corporations Anaconda Copper Company and Kennecott Utah Copper Corporation to the Chilean state and in 1976 CODELCO was created in order to manage the development and production. The law has been modified in 1973, 1975, 1986 and 1987.

The Law 
The Ley Reservada del Cobre stipulates that 10 per cent of Codelco's export sales are to be 
transferred to the armed forces. Each year Codelco deposits the earmarked resources in dollars in three secret accounts (army, air force and navy) at the Central Bank of Chile. These accounts are maintained outside the treasury single account and the parliamentary oversight, fragmenting it and impeding obtaining the benefits of managing all government cash in a centralized way.

The expected minimum contribution is US$180 million annually, the floor, to be adjusted according to variations in the U.S. Producer Price Index. In case the revenues are less than the stated amount, as in 1986 and 1987 occurred, the Treasury must supply the difference (US$38 and US$25 million, respectively).

During the decade 1995-2005 the government managed to restrict the annual level of investment spending by the armed forces by imposing a ceiling on them in order to guarantee that their expenditures are consistent with the structural fiscal balance limit. However, the ceiling does not reduce the amounts received by the armed forces; any surpluses are accumulated in the bank accounts of the defense sector.

The Chilean armed forces have transformed into the region's most capable military forces, both in training, force composition, logistics as in the general quality of their materiel. Their technical capabilities as well as local industrial capacity to service the majority of its equipment is far superior to any other country in the region. Chile has been pushing its armed forces to reach NATO standards and is able to conduct domestic and external operations to a high degree.

In 2011, the Finance Ministry took over management of the military's copper fund from the Defence Ministry.

Criticism 

Funding the Chilean military with off-budget revenues from a stateowned company is controversial and not in line with practices in most developed countries because: 
 it is outside democratic control,
 it doesn't compete with other sectors for funds
 it does not necessarily reflect the government's priorities and sectoral strategies
 it is not under supervision or accountability on the use of the funds

In addition, the procurement process for military equipment is a closed process. As stated by SIPRI, “Chile’s arms procurement process is almost entirely under the armed forces’ control and takes place with little or no civilian political involvement”.

A January 7, 2007, article in The New York Times explained that “record prices for copper, Chile’s main export, have given the government a multibillion-dollar windfall, but it also has produced for Chile’s economy unexpected side effects and has set off a sharp political debate about how to use the money.”

Also the fact that Codelco serves the interests of the armed forces is viewed as a serious impediment for a firm that strives to be a worldclass mining company.

A new law 
Legal initiatives modifying the financing scheme, establishing a four-year budget and replacing the current law, has been announced on September 8, 2009, by Michelle Bachelet and May 17, 2011, by President Sebastián Piñera.

Under Bachelet's project, allocations for arms procurement will be made on a yearly basis as part of the national budget; there will be a 12-year strategic plan for long-term procurement, revisable every four years by the president; and the unspent funds received under the 1958 law will be used to create a contingency fund for the replacement or refurbishment of equipment. The project was not approved.

Piñera's project considers multi-annual budgets approved during the first year in office of each government, a planning process with a horizon of twelve years, reincorporation of Congress into the debate on defense strategic capabilities, creation of a Strategic Contingency Fund, which will allow the Armed Forces to address unforeseen circumstances arising from external threats or national disasters. 
Piñera revived this bill, with amendments, in 2018, and signed it into law in September 2019.

See also 
 Chilean armed forces

References

External links 
 Chilean news in website "El Mostrador" published on 5 May 2016 the content of the law in Exclusivo: esta es la secreta “Ley Reservada del Cobre”. archive.org: . archive.org: , 
 Michael Radseck, Rohstoffe und Rüstung. Hintergründe und Wirkungen ressourcenfinanzierter Waffenkäufe in Südamerika, in Lateinamerika Analysen N° 16, 1/2007, Page 203–241, Edited by Institut für Lateinamerika-Studien, Hamburg, Germany, in German Language
 Israel Fainboim, Changing the Financial Management of the Defense Sector in Chile: Leaving Expenditure Earmarks Behind, November 25, 2009, International Monetary Fund

Law of Chile
Military of Chile
Government of Chile
Politics of Chile
1958 in Chilean law